Salmon Falls Massacre can refer to:

 Raid on Salmon Falls (1690), in present-day Maine, United States
 Utter Party Massacre (1860), in present-day Idaho, United States